Mondo Keyhole is a 1966 film directed by Jack Hill in his directorial debut. A sexploitation drama, it covers themes such as the pornography business, drug-taking, rape, martial arts and revenge.

Plot
Howard Thorne is a rapist in Los Angeles: he meets women at work and at parties or he sees them walking down the street, and he follows them, terrifies them, and assaults them. He also dreams about these assaults, and he's unclear how much of what he's done is real and how much is fantasy. He ignores his heroin-using wife, Vicki, who tries everything she can think of to get his sexual attention. Howard and Vicki go separately to a costume party where she learns the full truth about his nature and where he is stalked by one of his recent victims. Individualized versions of Hell await Howard and Vicki.

Cast
Nick Moriarty as Howard Thorne
Adele Rein as Vicky
Cathy Crowfoot as The Crow
Carol Baughman as Carol
Christopher Winters as Vampire

References

External links

1966 films
Films directed by Jack Hill
American rape and revenge films
American sexploitation films
1966 directorial debut films
1960s English-language films
1960s American films